"Southern Style" is a song recorded by American country music artist Darius Rucker. It was released to radio on May 4, 2015 as the second single from his fourth country studio album of the same name.  The song was written by Rucker along with Tim James and Rivers Rutherford.

Critical reception
Website Taste of Country reviewed the single favorably, saying that "The title track from Darius Rucker’s Southern Style album is thick with imagery. Not since Buddy Jewell’s “Sweet Southern Comfort” has a song about the South been so easy to embrace."

Music video
The music video was directed by Peter Zavadil and premiered in July 2015.

Chart performance

References

2015 songs
2015 singles
Darius Rucker songs
Songs written by Tim James (country music songwriter)
Songs written by Rivers Rutherford
Capitol Records Nashville singles
Song recordings produced by Frank Rogers (record producer)
Music videos directed by Peter Zavadil